The Paul Marks Prize for Cancer Research is awarded by the Memorial Sloan Kettering Cancer Center to recognize cancer researchers who are making significant contributions to the understanding of cancer or are improving the treatment of the disease through basic or clinical research.

The prize is awarded biennially to up to three recipients aged 45 or younger, who are selected by a panel of investigators from leading research institutions. Each presents his or her work at a scientific symposium at Memorial Sloan Kettering Cancer Center, receives a medal and shares a cash award of $150,000. The prize is named after Paul A. Marks, President Emeritus of the Memorial Sloan Kettering Cancer Center.

Prizewinners
Source: Memorial Sloan Kettering Cancer Center
2021 Ralph J. DeBerardinis, Sun Hur, Charles Swanton
2019 Nathanael Gray, Joshua Mendell, Christopher Vakoc
2017 Gad Getz, Chuan He, Aviv Regev
2015 Bradley Bernstein, Howard Y. Chang, and Daniel Durocher
2013 Simon J. Boulton, Levi A. Garraway, and Duojia Pan
2011 Scott A. Armstrong, Kornelia Polyak, and Victor E. Velculescu
2009 Arul Chinnaiyan, Matthew Meyerson, and David M. Sabatini
2007 Angelika Amon, Todd R. Golub, and Gregory J. Hannon
2005 Tyler Jacks, Scott Lowe, and Jeff Wrana
2003 Yuan Chang, John F. X. Diffley, and Nikola Pavletich
2001 Titia de Lange, Stephen J. Elledge, William G. Kaelin Jr., and Xiaodong Wang

See also

 List of medicine awards
 List of prizes named after people

References

Cancer research awards
American awards
Awards established in 2001